Ealing Central and Acton is a constituency created in 2010, represented in the House of Commons of the UK Parliament since 2015 by Rupa Huq, who was elected as a Labour MP, suspended from the party in September 2022 following alleged racist comments, and reinstated in March 2023.

Constituency profile
The seat takes in an eastern third of the London Borough of Ealing – including the commercial centres of Acton and Ealing. There are suburban residential side streets, educational establishments, small industrial estates, sports areas, part of the Grand Union Canal and parks, centred around the Uxbridge Road (A4020). This is one of the more affluent seats in London. The seat consists of 8 electoral wards: Ealing Broadway, Ealing Common, East Acton, Hanger Hill, North Acton, South Acton, Southfield and Walpole.

Political history
The Fifth Periodic Review of Westminster constituencies created the seat by selecting wards for the year 2010 to equalise electorates.  Here, if votes were cast as in 2005, this seat would have produced a three-way marginal between the Conservative (32.8%), Labour (32.6%), and Liberal Democrats (29.7%) parties. An analysis of intervening local results indicated that the seat would, if no voters were swung nor new voters introduced, present a tiny Labour majority.
2010 campaign
In the 2010 general election, Angie Bray, a Conservative, won the seat with a majority of 3,716, representing a swing from Labour to the Conservatives of 5%. 
2015
According to the BBC, heavy campaigning in the 2015 general election was expected by leading figures and regional activists of the two largest political parties; at the time it was 56th on the list of Labour target seats. In a mixed election for two-way targets of the two largest parties, Labour's Rupa Huq won the constituency. The 2015 result gave the seat the 2nd most marginal majority of Labour's 232 seats by percentage of majority.
2017
In April 2017, the Green Party announced that it would not stand a candidate in this constituency for the 2017 general election and instead lend its support to the sitting MP, Rupa Huq.

Boundaries

The constituency consists of the following electoral wards of the London Borough of Ealing:
Acton Central, Ealing Broadway, Ealing Common, East Acton, Hanger Hill, South Acton, Southfield, and Walpole

The constituency was created with an electorate close to the electoral quota of 69,703 for 2006.

Members of Parliament

Election results

Elections in the 2010s

See also
 List of parliamentary constituencies in London

Notes

References

External links 
Politics Resources (Election results from 1922 onwards)
Electoral Calculus (Election results from 1955 onwards)

Parliamentary constituencies in London
Ealing Central and Acton
Politics of the London Borough of Ealing
Acton, London